Palmer Glacier is a glacier on the south slopes of Mount Hood in the U.S. state of Oregon. Palmer Glacier is the most well-known of the twelve glaciers on the mountain, and is a popular destination for snow sport enthusiasts. Some of the lower part is within the Timberline ski area, and can be accessed by Sno-Cat or chairlift, conditions permitting.

The glacier is a remnant of the massive glaciers that formed during the last ice age, and is the only location in North America that provides skiing and snowboarding all twelve months of the year.

The glacier was considered a snow field until a Mazama committee investigated on October 19, 1924 and determined it was, in fact, a glacier and should be named on maps.  For some time after that it was known as Salmon River Glacier as it is the headwaters of the Salmon River.

Silcox Hut is a small lodge originally built as a warming hut for skiers and climbers, but is now available for group rental for events and rustic overnight accommodation. It is located near the base of the glacier, about  vertically up from Timberline Lodge near the upper terminal of the Magic Mile ski lift.

The glacier is bounded on the east by a ridge shared with White River Canyon (which contains White River Glacier) and on the west by Zigzag Glacier and Zigzag Canyon, the source of the Zigzag River.  The upper glacier narrows to a vertex near the base of Steel Cliff, an area known as Triangle Moraine.  Below the glacier, its snowfield varies significantly seasonally, varying in length by almost .

During the summer ski season (approximately May through September), the upper half of the Palmer Chairlift terrain is divided into lanes.  Lanes nearest the lift are open to the public, while the others are allocated to ski and snowboard camps, ski coaches and other organizations.

Between late summer and the first snowfalls of autumn, the glacier is generally unusable for skiing.

See also
List of glaciers in the United States

Notes

References

Glaciers of Mount Hood
Glaciers of Clackamas County, Oregon
Mount Hood National Forest
Glaciers of Oregon